The Apostolic Vicariate (or Vicariate Apostolic) of Vientiane is a territorial jurisdiction of the Catholic Church located in northern Laos.

As an apostolic vicariate, it is a pre-diocesan jurisdiction, entitled to a titular bishop, and it is exempt, i.e., not part of any ecclesiastical province and instead directly dependent on the Holy See through the Congregation for the Evangelization of Peoples.

The Apostolic Vicariate's episcopal cathedral see is Sacred Heart Cathedral in Vientiane, one of the country's largest churches. Cardinal Louis-Marie Ling Mangkhanekhoun is its apostolic vicar.

Statistics 
The vicariate covers 74,195 km² in the civil Laotian provinces of Houaphan, Xiangkhoang, Vientiane Province, Vientiane Prefecture and most of Bolikhamsai.
 
As per 2014 it pastorally served 14,947 Catholics (0.7% of 2,216,558 total) in 23 parishes with 5 priests (1 diocesan, 4 religious) and 24 lay religious (4 brothers, 20 sisters).

History 
The vicariate dates back to the Apostolic Prefecture of Vientiane and Luang-Prabang, which was created on June 14, 1938, by splitting off the northern part of the Apostolic Vicariate of Laos.

On March 13, 1952, it was elevated to an Apostolic vicariate and renamed Vientiane after its largest city, the Laotian national capital.
 
The northern part around Luang Prabang was split off on March 3, 1963, to establish the Apostolic Vicariate of Luang Prabang, which since then has often been held in personal union with Vientiane or by an Apostolic administrator.

Ordinaries

Apostolic Prefect of Vientiane and Luang-Prabang
 Giovanni Enrico Mazoyer, O.M.I. (1938-1952)

Apostolic Vicars of Vientiane
 Etienne-Auguste-Germain Loosdregt, O.M.I. (1952-1975)
 Thomas Nantha (1975-1984)
 Jean Khamsé Vithavong, O.M.I. (1984-2017)
 Cardinal Louis-Marie Ling Mangkhanekhoun, I.V.D. (2017–present)

Coadjutor Bishop
 Jean Khamsé Vithavong, O.M.I. (1982-1984)

Auxiliary Bishop
 Lionello Berti, O.M.I. (1962-1963), appointed Apostolic Vicar of Luang Prabang

See also 
 List of Catholic dioceses in Laos

Sources and external links 
 GCatholic, with Google satellite photo
 Catholic hierarchy

Apostolic vicariates
Roman Catholic dioceses in Laos
Religious organizations established in 1938
Vientiane
Roman Catholic dioceses and prelatures established in the 20th century
1938 establishments in Laos